Christiano "Tuka" Chiaradia Alcoba Rocha (December 13, 1982 – November 17, 2019) was a Brazilian race car driver. He won numerous karting championships in Brazil from 1996 to 2000. Then moved up to South American Formula 3 Lights. In 2002 he moved to Europe to compete in the World Series by Nissan where he was Ricardo Zonta's teammate. In 2004 he competed in Superfund Euro 3000. In 2005 he was a test driver for A1 Team Brazil in the A1 Grand Prix Series and was named one of the team's race drivers for the 2006-2007 season. In 2008 Tuka was chosen to drive the Flamengo's car in Formula Superleague.

Rocha died on November 17, 2019, three days after being involved in a small airplane crash near Bahia, Brazil. On a private flight from Jundiaí Airport to Maraú-Barra Grande Airport near Maraú the aircraft crashed on landing. The Cessna Citation II burst into flames fatally injuring Tuka Rocha and two others.

Racing career

Superleague Formula record

Complete Stock Car Brasil results

References

External links
 Rocha's personal website

1982 births
2019 deaths
Brazilian racing drivers
A1 Team Brazil drivers
Auto GP drivers
Formula 3 Sudamericana drivers
Superleague Formula drivers
Stock Car Brasil drivers
Victims of aviation accidents or incidents in Brazil
Victims of aviation accidents or incidents in 2019
Racing drivers from São Paulo
Piquet GP drivers
Team Astromega drivers
Euronova Racing drivers
Durango drivers
A1 Grand Prix drivers
Charouz Racing System drivers